Domitia marshalli is a species of beetle in the family Cerambycidae. It was described by Stephan von Breuning in 1935. It is known from the Republic of the Congo, the Democratic Republic of the Congo, the Central African Republic, and Nigeria.

References

Lamiini
Beetles described in 1935